Vidyasagar Setu, also known as the Second Hooghly Bridge, is a toll bridge over the Hooghly River in West Bengal, India, linking the cities of Kolkata and Howrah.

It was the second bridge to be built across the Hooghly River; the first, the Howrah Bridge (also known as Rabindra Setu)  to the north, was completed in 1943. Named after the education reformer Pandit Ishwar Chandra Vidyasagar, it cost  to build. The project was a joint effort between the public and private sectors, under the control of the Hooghly River Bridge Commissioners (HRBC).

The importance of the bridge has increased manifold since 2013, as the West Bengal State Secretariat had shifted its office to Nabanna, located adjacent to the bridge on the Howrah side.

Initially, under the toll collection regime of the HRBC, daily traffic was recorded to be a minimum of 28,000 vehicles and a maximum of 39,000 vehicles in 2000, but fell to a maximum of around 30,000 vehicles by December 2002, when the management of the toll plaza was handed over to a private firm. Subsequently, the daily traffic reached a minimum of 45,000 vehicles and a maximum of 61,000 vehicles by early 2008, against a maximum capacity of 85,000 vehicles per day. The original management of the toll revenue collection by HRBC was consequently criticized for corruption and significant loss of revenue.

History

Population and commercial activity grew rapidly after India gained independence in August 1947. The only link across the Hooghly River, the Howrah Bridge between Howrah and Kolkata, was subject to much traffic congestion, with over 85,000 vehicles every day. This necessitated planning for a new bridge across the river so that it could connect to the major cities of Mumbai (Bombay), Delhi and Chennai (Madras) through the national highways located close to the bridge.

The foundation stone for the bridge was laid by Indira Gandhi on 20 May 1972. The bridge took 20 years to complete and cost , but during seven of those years there was no construction activity. The bridge is named after the 19th-century Bengali education reformer Pandit Ishwar Chandra Vidyasagar. Work on the cable-stayed bridge started with the construction of the well curb on the Kolkata bank on 3 July 1979.

Kona Expressway and Vidyasagar Setu experienced an exponential rise in the volume of traffic over a couple of years. Over 100,000 vehicles take the expressway to reach Kolkata via Vidyasagar Setu.

Construction

The bridge was designed by Schlaich Bergermann & Partner, and checked by Freeman Fox & Partners and Bharat Bhari Udyog Nigam Limited. Construction was carried out by the consortium of "The Braithwaite Burn and Jessop Construction Company Limited" (BBJ). The Hooghly River Bridge Commission (HRBC) was responsible for the commissioning operations of the bridge. Construction began on 3 July 1979, and the bridge was commissioned on 10 October 1992 by the Hooghly River Bridge Commission.

Architectural features

The deck is made of composite steel-reinforced concrete with two carriageways. Vidyasagar Setu is a toll bridge. It has capacity to handle more than 85,000 vehicles in a day.

The design of the bridge differs slightly from other bridges, which are of live load composite construction. The difference is in the dead load design concept adopted for this bridge and concreting of the side spans done with support provided by the intermediate trestle. The deck is designed with a grid structure of girders. One set of girders are at the end and another set in the middle, which are braced by girders spaced on an average at  centre to centre.

A deck crane was used for the construction of the main span of the bridge. A specially designed crane of 45 tonne capacity was used to erect the pylons of the bridge. The structural steel used in the bridge weighs about 13,200 tonnes. They are provided with two cross portal members, one at the bottom and another at the top, below the pylon head. The deck is connected to the end piers by bolts embedded in the chambers of the piers. Pylons made of  steel boxes of riveted construction were raised on the two side spans of the bridge; one set is on the Kolkata side and the other is on the Howrah side. The six pylons on the Kolkata side of the bridge were installed using 75 MT and 50 MT cranes, while on the Howrah end, a single 50 MT crane was used. Anchorage of the pylon with the base of piers was effected through tie rods anchored in the piers. Cables were erected from the four pylon heads with the help of 32 hoist frames. The hoist frames were mounted on top of each pylon. Sheave blocks, winches and snatch blocks were used to facilitate the lifting, and cables inside the pylons were stressed with jacks. Pressure grouting was performed to fill the voids between the wire and the high-density polyethylene (HDPE) tubes. A two tonne tower crane, fixed inside the pylons, lifted the cables into position.The bridge has been subject to prototype wind tunnel tests at the Indian Institute of Science in Bangalore. Bearings are used in vertical and horizontal directions, with grouted collars in four segments at the two end piers and horizontal bearings at the two middle piers to achieve stability against lateral movement. Maurer Söhne expansion joints were provided to allow for  horizontal expansion at the free ends.  fixed-end slab seal type expansion joints were used for horizontal expansion of the joints. Other essential components provided in the bridge structure are the handrails, lightning arresters, crash barriers, gas service support structures, telephone and electric lines, lifts in the pylons, and a maintenance gantry.

Post-construction plans

Over the years, several accidents have occurred on the bridge resulting in traffic congestion, and sometimes closure of the bridge for a few hours at a time. To relieve the heavy traffic congestion at the entry to the bridge, the Hooghly River Bridge Commissioners (HRBC) plan to build two one-way exit and entry ramps. These are planned with a semi-circular layout in the form of side wings, which will facilitate easier flow of traffic before the toll plaza on roads leading to the Howrah railway station. There are also plans to improve the lighting on the bridge by installing LED lamps and searchlights covering the four pylons, the bridge spans, cables and under-deck. An electronic toll collection system was scheduled to be introduced by 2014, to help improve the flow of traffic across the bridge.

The traffic projections for the bridge at the planning stage have not been reached. A traffic survey carried out during one week in June 2012 recorded traffic of 29,000 vehicles over the bridge in comparison to a projected 85,000. A survey conducted during the same period in June 2012 indicated a figure of 31,865 vehicles, though it is reported by the concerned traffic and transportation engineer that the rate of increase in traffic has been one percent per year on the basis of traffic surveys carried out from the time of commissioning of the bridge. The reason for the fall in traffic during 2012 is attributed to the peak monsoon effect during the survey period.

See also
List of largest cable-stayed bridges
List of longest bridges in the world
List of longest bridges above water in India

References

Bibliography

Cable-stayed bridges in India
Toll bridges in India
Bridges in West Bengal
Bridges in Kolkata
Buildings and structures in Howrah district
Rail transport in Howrah
Bridges completed in 1992
Tourist attractions in Howrah
20th-century architecture in India